Rábaszentmiklós is a village in Hungary, in the Győr-Moson-Sopron county.

Geography, setting, neighbours
The village is situated in the southern part of Győr-Moson-Sopron County, near to the Sokoró hill, in the Marcal-basin. The soil is loessy, limy sand, while between the Marcal and Rába rivers clay is the main component of the soil. The landscape is a plain, with some hills and plateaus  with 114–120 m above the sea level.

The history of the village
The chronicles mention the village with several names: Kisszentmiklós, Kerekszentmiklós on the basis of its rotunda church from the 11th century. Charters from the Árpád-house kings of Hungary mentions the village first from 1287 A. D., when Ladislaus IV of Hungary gives the village to Gergely de genere Osl, for his home defending merits. During the Mongolian invasion of 1241-1242 the village was destroyed. Lajos I of Hungary gives the village to the Kanizsay family. Then the Turkish invasion destroys the village in the 16th century. The Bishop of Győr refounds the village in 1701. The old rotunda church has been rebuilt in the first years of the 20th century.

Sightseeings
The rotunda of the 11th century.
The memorial of the heroes of the World Wars.
The Marcal river.

References

 Gervers-Molnár, V. (1972): A középkori Magyarország rotundái. (Rotunda in the Medieval Hungary). Akadémiai, Budapest
 Gerevich T. (1938): Magyarország románkori emlékei. (Die romanische Denkmäler Ungarns.) Egyetemi nyomda. Budapest
 Gerő, L. (1984): Magyar műemléki ABC. (Hungarian Architectural Heritage ABC.) Budapest
 Henszlmann, I. (1876): Magyarország ó-keresztyén, román és átmeneti stylü mű-emlékeinek rövid ismertetése, (Old-Christian, Romanesque and Transitional Style Architecture in Hungary). Királyi Magyar Egyetemi Nyomda, Budapest
 Szőnyi O. (É.n.): Régi magyar templomok. Alte Ungarische Kirchen. Anciennes églises Hongroises. Hungarian Churches of Yore. A Műemlékek Országos Bizottsága. Mirályi Magyar Egyetemi Nyomda, Budapest.
 Dercsényi D. (1972): Románkori építészet Magyarországon. Corvina, Budapest

External links
 https://archive.today/20031208100100/http://www.vendegvaro.hu/5-2240
 
 http://www.terkepcentrum.hu/index.asp?go=map&mid=8&tid=17297
 https://web.archive.org/web/20081230232703/http://www.casa-mia.at/ungarn-information.php/vId/48
Aerial photographs of Rábaszenmiklós

Populated places in Győr-Moson-Sopron County
Romanesque architecture in Hungary